Glabellula is a genus of micro bee flies in the family Mythicomyiidae. There are more than 30 described species in Glabellula.

Species
These 33 species belong to the genus Glabellula:

 †Glabellula aggregata Evenhuis, 2013
 Glabellula arctica (Zetterstedt, 1838)
 Glabellula australis (Malloch, 1924)
 Glabellula binotata Hall & Evenhuis, 1984
 † Glabellula brunnifrons Evenhuis, 2002
 Glabellula canariensis Frey, 1936
 Glabellula catiapatiuae Mendes, Evenhuis, Limeira-de-Oliveira & Lamas, 2022
 Glabellula crassicornis (Greene, 1924)
 †Glabellula electrica Hennig, 1966
 Glabellula fasciata Melander, 1950
 Glabellula femorata (Loew, 1873)
 Glabellula fumipennis Hall & Evenhuis, 1984
 † Glabellula grimaldii Evenhuis, 2002
 †Glabellula hannemanni Schumann, 1991
 Glabellula humeralis Gharali & Evenhuis, 2011
 †Glabellula kuehnei Schlüter, 1976
 Glabellula maroccana Evenhuis & Kettani, 2018
 Glabellula meridionalis Francois, 1955
 Glabellula metatarsalis Melander, 1950
 Glabellula nanella Melander, 1950
 Glabellula natalensis Hesse, 1967
 Glabellula nobilis Kertesz, 1912
 †Glabellula perkovskyi Evenhuis, 2013
 Glabellula pumila Melander, 1950
 Glabellula rafaelae Mendes, Evenhuis, Limeira-de-Oliveira & Lamas, 2022
 Glabellula rotundipennis Melander, 1950
 Glabellula sarahae Mendes, Evenhuis, Limeira-de-Oliveira & Lamas, 2022
 Glabellula sufflava François, 1969
 Glabellula tagos Evenhuis, 2019
 Glabellula thespia Evenhuis, 2009
 Glabellula unicolor Strobl, 1910
 Glabellula whartoni Evenhuis, 2019
 Glabellula yemeni Evenhuis & Gharali, 2020

References

Asiloidea genera
Mythicomyiidae